Mount Pleasant Township is one of twenty-four townships in Bates County, Missouri, and is part of the Kansas City metropolitan area within the USA.  As of the 2000 census, its population was 5,060.

The township was descriptively named.

Geography
According to the United States Census Bureau, Mount Pleasant Township covers an area of 35.95 square miles (93.11 square kilometers); of this, 35.79 square miles (92.71 square kilometers, 99.57 percent) is land and 0.16 square miles (0.41 square kilometers, 0.44 percent) is water.

Cities, towns, villages
 Butler

Adjacent townships
 Mound Township (north)
 Shawnee Township (northeast)
 Summit Township (east)
 Lone Oak Township (south)
 New Home Township (southwest)
 Charlotte Township (west)
 Elkhart Township (northwest)

Cemeteries
The township contains these two cemeteries: Morris and Oak Hill.

Major highways
  U.S. Route 71
  Missouri Route 52

Airports and landing strips
 Bates County Hospital Heliport
 Butler Memorial Airport

Lakes
 Butler Recreational Lake
 Kennedy Lake

Landmarks
 Butler Country Club Golf Course
 Butler Golf Course

School districts
 Butler R-V School District

Political districts
 Missouri's 4th congressional district
 State House District 125
 State Senate District 31

References
 United States Census Bureau 2008 TIGER/Line Shapefiles
 United States Board on Geographic Names (GNIS)
 United States National Atlas

External links
 US-Counties.com
 City-Data.com

Townships in Bates County, Missouri
Townships in Missouri